Indian Heaven Wilderness is a protected area located inside the Gifford Pinchot National Forest of southwestern Washington state. The wilderness also contains the Indian Heaven volcanic field. Originally known to the Indians as "Sahalee Tyee," the area has been and remains culturally important to Native Americans. During the past 9,000 years, the Yakima, Klickitat, Cascades, Wasco, Wishram, and Umatilla tribes gathered in this area for berry picking, fishing, and hunting.

Landforms 
Lava once flowed from the numerous volcanic cones that rise above the plateau, consisting mainly of overlapping shield volcanoes, spatter cones, and cinder cones,  which averages  in elevation. The wilderness' highest point is Lemei Rock (5,927 ft), whose crater now contains Lake Wapiki. Other prominent volcanic peaks include Bird Mountain, Sawtooth Mountain, Gifford Peak, East Crater, and Red Mountain. Big Lava Bed is the result of the most recent volcanic activity about 8,200 years ago.

Geology
Lemei Rock is one of the many shield volcanoes topped by cinder cones and spatter cones that make up the Indian Heaven volcanic field.

Wildlife

Fauna
Deer and elk reside in the wilderness area until winter snows drive them lower, along with black bears attracted to the abundant ripening of fall huckleberries. Numerous bird species reside in the wilderness along with various small forest animals, such as chipmunks.

Flora
The forest conifers consist mainly of subalpine fir and Douglas fir. The area (including the Sawtooth Berry Fields) is known for its abundant huckleberries in mid-August to early September. They grow abundantly in the old, fire-scarred forest meadows burned in the past by Natives to stimulate more huckleberry production.

Recreation 
The Pacific Crest National Scenic Trail passes north/south through the wilderness, which is known for its many lakes and views of four nearby volcanoes: Mount Adams, Mount Hood, Mount St. Helens, and Mount Rainier. It is also known to hikers for an intense population of mosquitoes throughout the summer. Other major trails in the area are Indian Heaven Trail and the Cultus Creek Trail, which climbs up the east side of Bird Mountain, and Lemei Trail which traverses up the east side of Lemei Rock and passes by Lake Wapiki. In late fall, the huckleberry bushes provide berries as well as intense orange color in some years.

In 2015, nearly 8,000 people visited the wilderness area for recreational purposes, exceeding the Forest Service's standards for solitude.

References

External links
 
Indian Heaven Wilderness U.S. Forest Service
Indian Heaven Wilderness Wilderness.net (The University of Montana)

Wilderness areas of Washington (state)
Cascade Range
Protected areas of Skamania County, Washington
Gifford Pinchot National Forest